Uffenheim is a city in the Middle Franconian district of Neustadt (Aisch)-Bad Windsheim, in Bavaria, Germany. It is situated 14 km west of Bad Windsheim, and 36 km southeast of Würzburg.

Town structure 

Uffenheim consists of 13 divisions:

Personalities 

 Johann Lukas Boër, actually Boogers (1751-1835), physician, obstetrician and university lecturer
 Karl Arnold (1853-1929), chemist
 Julius Sämann (1911-1999), perfumer and chemist; inventor of the Little Trees

References

Neustadt (Aisch)-Bad Windsheim